Braithwaite railway station was situated on the Cockermouth, Keswick and Penrith Railway between Penrith and Cockermouth in Cumbria, England. The station served the village of Braithwaite.

The station opened to passenger traffic on 2 January 1865. The station was host to six LMS caravans in 1934 and 1935 followed by eight caravans from 1936 to 1939. A camping coach was also positioned here by the London Midland Region from 1958 to 1964.

The station closed on 18 April 1966.

The station building survives as a private residence.

References

Further reading
 
 
 

Disused railway stations in Cumbria
Former Cockermouth, Keswick and Penrith Railway stations
Railway stations in Great Britain opened in 1865
Railway stations in Great Britain closed in 1966
Beeching closures in England